Warringah is a name taken from the local Aboriginal word for Middle Harbour, in Sydney, New South Wales, Australia. It may refer to:

Division of Warringah, an electoral division of the Australian House of Representatives created in 1922
Electoral district of Warringah, a former electoral district of the New South Wales Legislative Assembly
Warringah Council, a former local government area covering Sydney's Northern Beaches
Warringah Shire Hall, the former meeting place of Warringah Shire
Warringah Civic Centre, a civic building in Dee Why, a suburb of Sydney
Warringah Freeway, Sydney, New South Wales
Westfield Warringah Mall, Brookvale, on Sydney's Northern Beaches
Warringa Ward, a former ward of North Sydney Council, New South Wales